She Says is the eighth studio album by Singaporean singer JJ Lin, released on 21 January 2011 by Ocean Butterflies.

Track listing
 "她說" (She Says)
 "愛笑的眼睛" (Smiling Eyes) (Original artist: Vivian Hsu)
 "只對你有感覺" (Feel for You) (Original artist: Hebe Tien & Fahrenheit)
 "當你" (When You) (Original artist: Cyndi Wang)
 "一眼萬年" (Forever) (Original artist: S.H.E)
 "保護色 " (Protective Colors) – feat. Angela Chang
 "握不住的他" (The Taste of Love) (Original artist: Ruby Siu)
 "心牆" (Wall) (Original artist: Bae Liu & Claire Kuo)
 "我很想愛他" (I Really Wanna Love Her) (Original artist: Twins)
 "一生的愛" (Eternal Love) (Original artist: Li Bingbing)
 "記得" (Remember) (Original artist: A-Mei)
 "完美新世界" (Perfect World)
 "I Am"

References

External links
  JJ Lin discography@Avex Taiwan

2011 albums
JJ Lin albums
Avex Taiwan albums